Cyclothorax is a genus of mites in the family Laelapidae.

Species
 Cyclothorax carcinicola von Frauenfeld, 1868

References

Laelapidae